None pizza with left beef is an Internet meme created by Steven Molaro based on a troll pizza order he made on October 19, 2007. It has been described as a "corporate yet hilarious monstrosity", a "perfect troll", and a "monument to humanity’s achievement and hubris".

History 
In the late 2000s, pizza delivery was in the midst of a "transitional technological moment", during which online ordering had been newly introduced, and pizzerias' websites were "rudimentary but nonetheless comprehensive". On October 19, 2007, Steve Molaro performed an experiment to "test the limits of topping customization"; he used the website's radio buttons to place a deliberately absurd order from Domino's, ordering a 6-inch pizza while deselecting all cheese, sauce, and toppings, with the sole exception of beef on the left side. He later posted the results of this experiment (including a screenshot of the order form and a photograph of the resulting delivery) to his blog, The Sneeze. Molaro described the pizza itself as "tasteless bread with salty meat pellets".

The post subsequently "went viral", and remained popular for years afterwards. Necklaces of the pizza were available for purchase, and the troll became a part of tumblr "lore".

In years since, the troll has often been used to illustrate the extreme (and often absurd) customization made possible by online food ordering systems. It has also been used as an example of the challenges inherent to user interface design: "Users will find ways to play games, to tell surprising truths, and invent combinations you cannot foresee".

Brian Feldman wrote in a 2017 New York Magazine retrospective that it was a "perfect troll": an absurd order that affects everyone it touches in some way. Those who receive the order must cook an "awful pizza", those who place the order must pay for it, and even those who are simply near the delivery of such a pizza are affected by its presence ("tainting the space in some intangible way"); Feldman posited that "we've become so focused on whether or not we can make None Pizza With Left Beef that we've forgotten to ask if we should".

References 

Internet memes introduced in 2007
Domino's Pizza
E-commerce